In Greek mythology, Cyparissus or Kyparissos (Ancient Greek: Κυπάρισσος, "cypress") was a boy beloved by Apollo or in some versions by other deities. In the best-known version of the story, the favorite companion of Cyparissus was a tamed stag, which he accidentally killed with his hunting javelin as it lay sleeping in the woods. The boy's grief was such that it transformed him into a cypress tree, a classical symbol of mourning. The myth is thus aetiological in explaining the relation of the tree to its cultural significance. The subject is mainly known from Hellenized Latin literature and frescoes from Pompeii. No Greek hero cult devoted to Cyparissus has been identified.

Family 
Cyparissus was the son of Telephus and thus the grandson of Heracles, and his story is set in Chios.

Mythology

As initiation myth

The myth of Cyparissus, like that of Hyacinthus, has often been interpreted as reflecting the social custom of pederasty in ancient Greece, with the boy the beloved (eromenos) of Apollo. Pederastic myth represents the process of initiation into adult male life, with a "death" and transfiguration for the eromenos.  "In all these tales," notes Karl Kerenyi, "the beautiful boys are doubles of [Apollo] himself."

The stag as a gift from Apollo reflects the custom in Archaic Greek society of the older male (erastēs) giving his beloved an animal, an act often alluded to in vase painting. In the initiatory context, the hunt is a supervised preparation for the manly arts of war and a testing ground for behavior, with the stag embodying the gift of the hunter's prey.

Ovid's version
 The tameness of the deer may be the invention of the Augustan poet Ovid, and a late literary reversal of the boy's traditional role. Ovid's Cyparissus is so grief-stricken at accidentally killing his pet that he asks Apollo to let his tears fall forever. The god then turns the boy into a cypress tree (Latin: cupressus), whose sap forms droplets like tears on the trunk.

Ovid frames the tale within the story of Orpheus, whose failure to retrieve his bride Eurydice from the underworld causes him to forsake the love of women in favor of that of boys. When Orpheus plays his lyre, even the trees are moved by the music; in the famous cavalcade of trees that ensues, the position of the cypress at the end prompts a transition to the metamorphosis of Cyparissus.

The commentaries of Servius and the Vatican Mythographer 

According to one of the Vatican Mythographers, another Roman tradition makes the lover out to be the woodland god Silvanus. An invocation by Virgil of "Silvanus who bears the slender cypress uprooted" was explained in the commentary of Servius as alluding to a love affair. In his brief account, Servius differs from Ovid mainly in substituting Silvanus for Apollo, but also changes the gender of the deer and makes the god responsible for its death:

Silvanus loved a boy (puer) named Cyparissus who had a tame deer. When Silvanus unintentionally killed her, the boy was consumed by sorrow. The lover-god turned him into the tree that has his name, which he is said to carry as a consolation.

It is unclear whether Servius is inventing an aition, a story to explain why Silvanus was depicted holding an evergreen bough, or recording an otherwise unknown version. Elsewhere, Servius mentions a version in which the lover of Cyparissus was Zephyrus, the West Wind. The cypress, he notes, was associated with the underworld, either because they don't grow back when pruned too severely, or because in Attica households in mourning are garlanded with cypress.

Kyparissos in Phocis
According to a different tradition, a Cyparissus, possibly not the same figure, was the son of Minyas, and the mythical founder of Kyparissos in Phocis, which later was called Anticyra.

In botany
The word Cupressus was used to describe a genus of cypress trees; this genus was first described in the 18th century by the Swedish biologist Linnaeus. In modern times there is a taxonomic debate regarding which species should be retained in the genus Cupressus.

See also 

 Apollo
 Hyacinth (mythology)
 Branchus

References

External links

Male lovers of Apollo
Metamorphoses into trees in Greek mythology
Metamorphoses characters